Goodsprings is an unincorporated community in Clark County, Nevada, United States. The population was 229 at the 2010 census.

History

Named for Joseph Good, whose cattle frequented a spring nestled in the southeastern foothills of the Spring Mountains, Goodsprings was once the heart of the most productive mining districts in Clark County. Over the years, lead, silver, copper, zinc and gold have all been mined from this area. Before 1900, a small cluster of tent cabins and a mill were erected, and a post office.  Lincoln County established Goodsprings Township. In 1904, Salt Lake City mining interests platted the Goodsprings Township. Most early buildings in the town were constructed during the boom spurred by the railroad in 1910–1911.

After a number of moves, the current Goodsprings Schoolhouse was erected in 1913. Now on the National Register of Historic Places, it is the oldest school in Clark County that was built as a school and is still used as a school.  Due to a shortage of funds, however, the Clark County School District is currently considering shutting the school down.

After World War I, mining slowed and families moved away. World War II created a second boom, but it too slowed after the war ended. The town's population has dwindled to approximately 200.

Goodsprings is the home of the Pioneer Saloon, considered to be one of the oldest saloons in Nevada (over 100 years old).  The saloon features a bullet hole on the side of the building and a coroner's letter describing how it was created.  The saloon is said by many to be haunted by the victim's ghost.  In addition, the Pioneer Saloon has a small memorial to both Clark Gable and Carole Lombard.  Ms. Lombard's plane TWA Flight 3 crashed into nearby Potosi Mountain on January 16, 1942. The saloon and hotel were the centers of operations for the search.  The accident resulted in her death.

The Goodsprings Waste Heat Recovery Station opened in 2010, providing 5MW of energy from waste heat produced at a Kern River Pipeline compressor station.

Geography
Goodsprings is in the Goodsprings Valley of southern Nevada. The Bird Spring Range lies to the northeast with Las Vegas beyond. The community is on Nevada State Route 161 five miles northeast of Jean and Interstate 15.

Climate
Goodsprings experiences an arid climate with long, hot summers, and mild winters.

Demographics

As of the census of 2000, there were 232 people, 107 households, and 63 families residing in the CDP. The racial makeup of the CDP was 89.66% White, 1.72% African American, 0.43% Native American, 1.72% from other races, and 6.47% from two or more races. Hispanic or Latino of any race were 4.74% of the population.

There were 107 households, out of which 20.6% had children under the age of 18 living with them, 45.8% were married couples living together, 11.2% had a female householder with no husband present, and 40.2% were non-families. 35.5% of all households were made up of individuals, and 13.1% had someone living alone who was 65 years of age or older. The average household size was 2.17 and the average family size was 2.83.

In the CDP, the population was spread out, with 22.8% under the age of 18, 3.0% from 18 to 24, 22.8% from 25 to 44, 28.9% from 45 to 64, and 22.4% who were 65 years of age or older. The median age was 46 years. For every 100 females, there were 90.2 males. For every 100 females age 18 and over, there were 105.7 males.

The median income for a household in the CDP was $40,430, and the median income for a family was $58,125. Males had a median income of $35,924 versus $28,594 for females. The per capita income for the CDP was $22,282. None of the families and 9.2% of the population were living below the poverty line, including no under eighteens and 19.6% of those over 64.

Education
Goodsprings has a public library, a branch of the Las Vegas-Clark County Library District.

In popular culture 
Goodsprings features as the starting location in the 2010 post-apocalyptic video game Fallout: New Vegas. A Fallout-themed event was held in the town in July 2022.

References

External links

 Goodsprings Historical Society
 MiningHistory.net's Goodsprings page

1900 establishments in Nevada
Census-designated places in Clark County, Nevada
Ivanpah Valley
Mining communities in Nevada
Nevada State Register of Historic Places
Populated places established in 1900
Populated places in the Mojave Desert